Ceren Sarper (born March 16, 1990 in İstanbul, Turkey) is a Turkish female basketball player. The young national plays for Fenerbahçe İstanbul as forward position. She is 187 cm tall and 72 kg weights. She is playing for Fenerbahçe İstanbul since 2000 in youth level and since 2006-2007 in senior level. She played 32 times for Turkey national women's basketball team.

Honors
Turkish Championship
Winners (1): 2007
Turkish Cup
Winners (1): 2007
Turkish Presidents Cup
Winners (1): 2007

See also
 Turkish women in sports

External links
Player Profile at fenerbahce.org

1990 births
Living people
Turkish women's basketball players
Fenerbahçe women's basketball players